Ledjana Prenga (born 19 December 1997) is  an Albanian reality television  contestant and media personality, known for debuting on Për'puthen, an Albanian dating reality television series that premiered on September 22, 2019, on Top Channel.

Life and career 
Ledjana was born in the small town of Rrëshen, Albania. She studied Dentistry at the University of Medicine, Tirana, in the Faculty of Dental Medicine. While still studying at the university, Ledjana decided to participate on the  reality show Për'puthen on Top Channel, starting from January 1, 2021.

References

Living people
1997 births
Reality television participants
Albanian television personalities
People from Rrëshen